Greifswald nuclear power station (German: Kernkraftwerk Greifswald, KKW Greifswald), also known as Lubmin nuclear power station, was the largest nuclear power station in East Germany before closure shortly after the German reunification.  The plants were of the VVER-440/V-230 type, which was the second generation of Soviet-designed plants.  The plant is in Lubmin near Greifswald, in the state of Mecklenburg-Vorpommern.

Closure

In late 1989, nuclear regulatory bodies of countries operating VVER plants found the need to fit many new safety systems, which were stated to have been necessary in almost all areas.  All East German reactors were closed soon after reunification, with restarting conditional on compliance with the stricter West German safety standards.

Convinced that upgrading to the new safety standards was not economically feasible, the new unified German government decided in early 1991 to decommission the four active units, close unit 5, which was under test at the time, and halt construction of the rest of the units there plus two VVER-1000s at the Stendal Nuclear Power Plant.

The district heating supplied by the plant was replaced by oil imports and in 1995 by a new natural gas plant.  Decommissioning of units 1 through 5 began in 1995, making Greifswald one of the first nuclear power stations in Germany to go through the process.  The plant came into focus again in 1996 when it was decided to move 235 unspent fuel assemblies to the Hungarian Paks Nuclear Power Plant, which is of the same design.

At its peak, the plant employed around 10,000 full-time workers; around 1,000 are working on decommissioning and other activities at the site.

Incidents

 7 December 1975 - An electrician wanted to show his apprentice how to bridge electrical circuits.  He decided to short-circuit the primary winding on one of the Unit 1 pumps by developing an arc following the edge of a wiring loom.  The fire in the main trough destroyed the current supply and the control lines of five of the unit's six main coolant pumps.  The fire was quickly brought under control by the fire-brigade and the pumps were temporarily repaired.  After this near-disaster, fire protection within the power station was substantially strengthened and separate electrical lines for each pump were introduced.  The incident was only made public in 1989.  A few hours after the incident the IAEA was informed by Soviet authorities, which classified the accident under INES 4, later revised to INES 3.
 24 November 1989 - Three out of six cooling water pumps were switched off for a test. A fourth pump broke down and control of the reactor was lost; ten fuel elements were damaged and the reactor was close to melting down. The accident was reportedly attributed to sticky relay contacts.

Reactor summary

In popular culture 

In Tom Clancy's 1991 novel The Sum of All Fears, the character Dr. Manfred Fromm is depicted as having been a technician at the plant before its closure and his recruitment by the Red Army Faction and the Popular Front for the Liberation of Palestine to construct a thermonuclear bomb. In the book, the facility is depicted as having secretly operated as a tritium production plant for a secret nuclear weapons program started by Erich Honecker.

See also

Repository for radioactive waste Morsleben
Nuclear plants built in the former East Germany
Stendal Nuclear Power Plant
Rheinsberg Nuclear Power Plant

References

Energy infrastructure completed in 1974
Former nuclear power stations in Germany
East Germany–Soviet Union relations
Nuclear power stations using VVER reactors
Companies based in Mecklenburg-Western Pomerania
Cancelled nuclear power stations
Unfinished nuclear reactors